Cassyette is an English singer-songwriter. Her debut single "Jean" was released 6 September 2019. She has been described by Clash Magazine as a Nu Metal "pop provocateur"  and "The electro-pop princess to keep on your radar".
In Rankin's Hunger Magazine. MTV say "her style is hardcore, women-fuelled rock". "Cassyette is the brand new up and coming rockstar".

Early life 
Cassyette began her career as a DJ and songwriter. After university, she "became a staple on the London live circuit".

Career 
Songwriting for various artists and bands alongside her own music, Cassyette merges pop and rock inspired sounds with modern-day electronic pop. Cassyette's first solo debut was labelled "A seriously well-crafted, addictive gem that should underline Cassyette's reputation as not only one of London's most relevant new artists, but a consummate beat maker and songwriter".

Cassyette has most recently appeared at Download Pilot festival, as her first festival debut as well as making a guest appearance alongside Frank Carter & the Rattlesnakes on their headlining slot.

Discography 

Singles

Filmography 

Film and television

References

External links
www.cassyette.co.uk

Living people
English women singer-songwriters
Year of birth missing (living people)